The table below shows the list of Nigerian Senators of the 9th National Assembly. The Senate includes three senators from each of the 36 states, plus one senator for the Federal Capital Territory. The Senate President  is the head of the house, and assisted by the Deputy Senate President. The Senate President and his Deputy also work with the Principal Officers in the house including the Majority Leader, Deputy Majority Leader, Minority Leader, Deputy Minority Leader, Chief Whip, Deputy Chief Whip, Minority Whip and Deputy Minority Whip.

Principal officers

Presiding officers

Majority leadership

Minority leadership

Membership by zone
:

Changes

Senators

Notes

See also 
 Nigerian Senate

References 

Politics of Nigeria
Government of Nigeria